Peroxynitrate (or peroxonitrate) refers to salts of the unstable peroxynitric acid, HNO4. Peroxynitrate is unstable and decomposes to nitrate and dioxygen.

No solid peroxynitrate salts are known. However, there is a report that the Russian chemist Sebastian Moiseevich Tanatar produced sodium peroxynitrate octahydrate (NaNO3·H2O2·8H2O) by evaporating a solution of sodium nitrate and hydrogen peroxide until crystallisation begins and then mixing with alcohol to form crystals of the octahydrate.

References

Oxyanions